This List of tourist attractions in Budapest lists the most important sights of Budapest by district and date of construction.

Sights by list

Churches, religious buildings
 St. Stephen's Basilica, the biggest church (1851-1905).
 Matthias Church, the oldest church (1015).
 Lutheran Church of Deák Square, the biggest Protestant church (1799–1808).
 Reformed Church of Kálvin Square, the most famous Reformed church (1816–1830).
 Church of Mary Magdalene, ruins of the oldest churches (ca. 13th century).
 Dohány Street Synagogue, largest synagogue in Europe (1854–1859).
 Inner City Parish Church in Pest (ca. 14th century).
 Saint Peter of Alcantara Franciscan Church (ca. 1241).
 Palace Chapel (ca. 15th century)
 University Church (1715–1771).
 Gellért Hill Cave, national chancel (1931).
 Saint Anne Parish (1761).
 St. Catherine of Alexandria Church (1749).
 St Elizabeth of the House of Arpad Parish Church (1895–1901).
 Our Lady of the Snows Parish Church (1694).
 Church of Stigmatisation of Saint Francis (1757).
 Szilágyi Dezső Square Reformed Church (1894–1896).
 Lutheran Church of Budavár, the oldest Lutheran church of Buda (1895).
 Tomb of Gül Baba, northernmost Islamic pilgrimage site in the world (1543–1548).
 Rumbach Street Synagogue (1869–1872).

Bridges

 Árpád Bridge, the busiest bridge (1950)
 Margaret Bridge, the second oldest bridge (1876)
 Széchenyi Chain Bridge, the oldest and most famous bridge (1849)
 Elisabeth Bridge, built across the narrowest part of the Danube (1903)
 Liberty Bridge, the third oldest bridge (1896)
 Petőfi Bridge (1937)
 Rákóczi Bridge (1995)

Sights by districts

Budapest-related lists
Budapest
 
Budapest